Get It Together may refer to:

Music
 "Get It Together" (Beastie Boys song), 1994
 "Get It Together" (James Brown song), 1967
 "Get It Together" (Drake song), 2017
 "Get It Together" (The Jackson 5 song), 1973
 "Get It Together" (Seal song), 2002
 "Get It Together" (702 song), 1997
 "Get It Together", a song by The Go! Team
 G.I.T.: Get It Together, a 1973 album by the Jackson 5
 Get It Together!, an album by the Supersuckers

Other
 Get It Together (British TV series), a children's music show broadcast in the United Kingdom from 1977 to 1981
 Get It Together (Australian TV series), a 2019 Australian children's television game show
WarioWare: Get It Together!, a 2021 Nintendo Switch action game